Daniel Stendel (born 4 April 1974) is a German professional football manager and former player, who currently is in charge of Hannover 96 II.

Stendel played as a striker in his native Germany, spending most of his playing career with Hannover 96, who he later managed. He then had a spell as manager of Barnsley, helping them win promotion to the Championship in his only full season before he was dismissed in October 2019. He was appointed manager of Scottish club Heart of Midlothian in December 2019. Hearts were relegated after the curtailed 2019–20 season, and in June 2020 Stendel was replaced as manager. In May 2021 he was appointed manager of Nancy, but was dismissed by the French club in September 2021.

Coaching career

Hannover 96
Parallel to his last as an active player, Stendel already worked as a co-coach at Hannover 96 II in the 2007-08 season. After his career ended a year later, he became coach of the U-17s; in 2013, he moved to the U-19s.

He was appointed head coach of Hannover 96 on 3 April 2016 for the remainder of the 2015–16 season. He had been coaching the under 19 team for Hannover. His first match finished in a 2–2 draw. His first win came in the following weekend, on 15 April 2016, in a 2–0 win against Borussia Mönchengladbach. He was sacked on 20 March 2017. He finished with a record of 17 wins, nine draws, and eight losses.

Barnsley
On 6 June 2018, Stendel was appointed as manager of League One club Barnsley on a two-year deal. On 13 April 2019, following a 4–2 home win over Fleetwood Town, South Yorkshire Police launched an investigation after opposition manager Joey Barton allegedly assaulted Stendel in the tunnel. After the incident, Barton was charged by South Yorkshire Police with ABH and bailed until 9 October 2019. At Sheffield Crown Court, in November 2021, Stendel said that he was shoved to the ground by Barton and fell into metal bars in the tunnel. On 6 December, Barton was found not guilty after a week-long trial.

On 8 October 2019, Stendel was sacked as manager of Barnsley, following a run of ten games without a win. Stendel's departure sparked widespread criticism of the board.

Heart of Midlothian
Stendel was appointed manager of Scottish club Hearts in December 2019, on a contract due to run until the summer of 2022. In March 2020, during the coronavirus pandemic, Scottish football was put on hold indefinitely. To help Hearts during this period, Stendel refused to take any wage payments. Hearts were bottom of the 2019–20 Scottish Premiership at the time the league was suspended, and were subsequently relegated when the league was curtailed. Stendel had a clause in his contract which meant that it was no longer in effect if Hearts were relegated from the Premiership, and the club appointed Robbie Neilson to replace him on 21 June 2020.

Nancy
On 20 May 2021, Stendel was appointed Manager of AS Nancy of France in Ligue 2 on an initial two-year contract. On 24 September 2021, Stendel was sacked from his role at the club following a 1–1 draw against a nine-man Amiens SC side, with the club at the bottom of the league table with no wins in the opening ten games.

Hannover 96 II
In July 2022, Stendel returned to Hannover, as he was appointed manager of the clubs reserve team, Hannover 96 II.

Managerial statistics

References

Living people
1974 births
German footballers
Association football forwards
Bundesliga players
2. Bundesliga players
1. FC Frankfurt players
Hamburger SV players
Hamburger SV II players
SV Meppen players
Hannover 96 players
Hannover 96 II players
FC St. Pauli players
FC Gütersloh 2000 players
German football managers
Bundesliga managers
English Football League managers
Scottish Professional Football League managers
Hannover 96 managers
Barnsley F.C. managers
Heart of Midlothian F.C. managers
AS Nancy Lorraine managers
German expatriate football managers
German expatriate sportspeople in England
Expatriate football managers in England
German expatriate sportspeople in Scotland
Expatriate football managers in Scotland
German expatriate sportspeople in France
Expatriate football managers in France
Sportspeople from Frankfurt (Oder)
Footballers from Brandenburg